Khokhra is an area located in Ahmedabad, India.

Khokhra had many textile mills such as Asoka Cotsyn and Arvind Limited. While most of the mills have shut down long back, couple of them still operate from Khokara. Khokhra has recently turned to be a much better locality as the closed mill compounds have been converted to educational and residential hubs. Khokhra now has a dental college, Engineering college, Commerce and arts college. Recently, many eateries have opened in the area.

References

Neighbourhoods in Ahmedabad